Christ's College is a name shared by several educational establishments. Among them are:

 Christ's College, Aberdeen, in Scotland
 Christ's College, Cambridge, one of the constituent Colleges of the University of Cambridge, England
 Christ's College of Education, a mixed Catholic teacher training college established 1964 in Liverpool, England, now a constituent of Liverpool Hope University
 Christ's College, Christchurch, an independent (private) Anglican boys' secondary school in Christchurch, New Zealand
 Christ's College, Finchley, a secondary school in London, England
 Christ's College, Guildford, a secondary school in southern England